Procimequat is a triploid citrus hybrid or transgeneric hybrid, (Citrus aurantifolia 'Mexican' x Fortunella japonica) x Fortunella hindsii, in which the limequat that itself is a cross between lime and a round kumquat, was backcrossed with the primitive Hong Kong kumquat.

The tiny fruits are orange in color, and about the size of a marble. Like some kumquats, it is eaten entirely, including the peel. It tastes like a combination of lemon, orange and celery.

Despite being triploid, the procimequat does produce seeds, which are nucellar and thus produce plants identical to the parent, independent of the pollen source.

See also 
Citrus taxonomy

References

External links 
 Procimequat by Citrus ID
 Home Citrus Growers
 Citrus Genetics, Breeding and Biotechnology

Kumquats
Limes (fruit)